Aase Hansen (January 13, 1935 – February 25, 1993) was a Danish actress.

She was born in Vigerslev in Søndersø. Hansen studied with Paula Illemann Feder and at the school of the Odense Teater from 1953 to 1956. In 1955, she played the role of Minna in the play Frisøndag.

Hansen went on to appear in seven films. She also appeared in several Danish television series including , Matador and Dr. Dip.

She received the Robert Award for Best Actress in a Supporting Role in 1985 for her performance in Tro, håb og kærlighed.

Films 
 Støv for alle pengene (1963)
 En ven i bolignøden (1965)
  (1975)
 Tro, håb og kærlighed , English version Twist and Shout (1984)
  (1989)
 Sirup (1990)
 Det Forsømte Forår , English version Stolen Spring (1993)

References

External links 
 

1935 births
1993 deaths
Danish actresses
People from Nordfyn Municipality